Tropidophorus beccarii, also known commonly as Beccari's keeled skink and Beccari's water skink,  is a species of lizard in the subfamily Lygosominae of the family Scincidae. The species is endemic to the island of Borneo.

Etymology
The specific name, beccarii, is in honor of Italian botanist Odoardo Beccari.

Geographic range
On the island of Borneo, T. beccarii is found in Brunei, northern Kalimantan (Indonesia), Sabah, and Sarawak (Malaysia).

Habitat

Description
Dorsally, T. beccarii is reddish brown, with dark brown crossbands. The flanks have whitish spots. Ventrally, it is yellowish. 

Diet
T. beccarii preys upon water insects.

Reproduction
T. beccarii is viviparous. Average litter size is four.

References

Further reading
Goldberg SR (2017). "Reproduction in Beccari's Keeled Skinks, Tropidophorus beccarii (Squamata: Scincidae), from Borneo". Bulletin of the Chicago Herpetological Society 52: 65.
Hikida T, Ota H (1994). "Sphenomorphus aquaticus Malkmus, 1991, a junior synonym of Tropidophorus beccarii (Peters, 1871) (Reptilia: Squamata: Scincidae)". Bonner Zoologische Beiträge 45 (1): 57–60.
Peters W (1871). "Über neue Reptilien aus Ostafrika und Sarawak (Borneo), vorzüglich aus der Sammlung des Hrn. Marquis J. Doria zu Genua". Monatsberichte der Königlich Preussischen Akademie der Wissenschaften zu Berlin 1871: 566–581. (Tropidophorus beccarii, new species, p. 574). (in German). 

beccarii
Endemic fauna of Borneo
Reptiles of Brunei
Reptiles of Indonesia
Reptiles of Malaysia
Reptiles described in 1871
Taxa named by Wilhelm Peters
Reptiles of Borneo